Norris is an unincorporated community in Henry County, in the U.S. state of Missouri.

History
The community took its name from a nearby creek of the same name. An early variant name was "Norris Forks". A post office called Norris Fork was established in 1852, the name was changed to Norris in 1882, and the post office closed in 1902.

References

Unincorporated communities in Henry County, Missouri
Unincorporated communities in Missouri